Espik (also Romanized as Espīk and Espīyak; also known as Esbek, Esbīk, Isbīk, and Is-hāq) is a village in Ramand-e Jonubi Rural District, Ramand District, Buin Zahra County, Qazvin Province, Iran. At the 2006 census, its population was 242, in 51 families.

References 

Populated places in Buin Zahra County